Kesh may refer to:

Places
 Keş, Azerbaijan
 Kesh, County Fermanagh, Northern Ireland
 Kesh railway station, 1866–1957
 Kesh (Sumer), an ancient Sumerian city and religious site 
 Kesh, historic name of Shahrisabz, Uzbekistan

Other uses
 Kesh (Sikhism), a practice of not cutting hair
 Albanian Power Corporation (Albanian: Korporata Elektroenergjitike Shqiptare, KESH), an electricity supplier
 Kesh, a fictional human culture and language in Ursula K. Le Guin's novel Always Coming Home
 The Empire of Great Kesh, a nation of the world of Midkemia, in books written by Raymond Feist

See also

 Kish (disambiguation)
 Lil Kesh (Keshinro Ololade, born 1995), Nigerian singer and rapper 
 RAF Long Kesh, a former Royal Air Force station in Northern Ireland
 HM Prison Maze, previously Long Kesh Detention Centre
 KESHHHHHH Recordings, a record label of British musician Simon Scott